Andrew Jobling (born 20 September 1964) is a former Australian rules footballer who played for the St Kilda Football Club in the Victorian Football League (VFL).

Jobling has been a personal trainer and café owner and is now an author and public speaker. He has written nine books that have sold over 200,000 copies.

Bibliography 
 Accidental Author
 Dance Until It Rains
 Eat Chocolate, Drink Alcohol and Be Lean and Healthy
 From Brilliant and Broke to Inspired and Abundant
 Kicking On
 The Wellness Puzzle
 Simply Strength
 Joia
 Powerful Beyond Measure

Notes

External links 
		

Living people
1964 births
Australian rules footballers from Victoria (Australia)
St Kilda Football Club players
Ormond Amateur Football Club players